Mikosch Comes In is a 1952 West German comedy film directed by Johann Alexander Hübler-Kahla and starring Georg Thomalla, Willy Fritsch and Paul Hörbiger. It was shot at the Tempelhof Studios in West Berlin. The film's sets were designed by the art directors Willi A. Herrmann and Heinrich Weidemann.

Cast
 Georg Thomalla as Janos Nawratil
 Willy Fritsch as Oberst von Körömsbös
 Paul Hörbiger as Dr. Paliwec
 Oskar Sima as Baron Mikosch
 Heli Finkenzeller as Claire von Ferency
 Paul Klinger as Tibor von Köröd
 Christiane Jansen as Margit von Ferency
 Ludwig Schmitz as Turmwurzel, Oberkellner
 Franz-Otto Krüger as Fotograf
 Kurt Pratsch-Kaufmann as Feldwebel Janos
 Bruno Fritz as Major von Itzenblitz
 Wolfgang Dohnberg as Oberleutnant von Bredow
 Gerd Frickhöffer as Leutnant von Kitzewitz
 Walter Gross as Fritz Pickelmann, Bursche
 Franz Arzdorf as Oberleutnant Graf Bobby
 Joe Furtner as Dorfpfarrer
 Wolfgang Neuss as Franzek
 Lucie Englisch as Erzy, Schweinemagd
 Peter Paul Richter as Karoli, Bursche
 Bruno W. Pantel as Eugen
 Friedl Hardt as Dancer

References

Bibliography 
 Hans-Michael Bock and Tim Bergfelder. The Concise Cinegraph: An Encyclopedia of German Cinema. Berghahn Books, 2009.

External links 
 

1952 films
1952 comedy films
German comedy films
West German films
1950s German-language films
Films directed by Johann Alexander Hübler-Kahla
Military humor in film
Films set in the 1900s
German black-and-white films
1950s German films
Films shot at Tempelhof Studios
German historical films
1950s historical films